Antiplecta is a genus of scoopwing moths in the family Uraniidae. There are about five described species in Antiplecta.

Species
These five species belong to the genus Antiplecta:
 Antiplecta caesia Warren, 1906
 Antiplecta cinerascens Warren, 1906
 Antiplecta nigripleta Warren, 1906
 Antiplecta pusilla Warren, 1900
 Antiplecta triangularis Warren, 1906

References

Further reading

 

Uraniidae
Articles created by Qbugbot